Houston Antonio George Jr. (born August 10, 1975) is an American former college and professional football player who was a defensive back in the National Football League (NFL) and NFL Europe for three seasons in 1999, 2000 and 2001. He played college football for the University of Florida, where he was a member of the Gators' consensus national championship team in 1996.  He was a third-round pick in the 1999 NFL Draft, and played for the New England Patriots and Frankfurt Galaxy.

Early years 

George was born in Cincinnati, Ohio.  George has a younger sister, Tari, who suffers from cerebral palsy; George has cited her as an inspiration.  He attended Winton Woods High School in Forest Park, Ohio, where he played high school football for the Winton Woods Warriors.  He was diagnosed as a Type 1 insulin-dependent diabetic in 1991, which was his sophomore year of high school.  As an Academic All-American in high school, George was recruited by 167 colleges and he chose the University of Florida.

College career 

George accepted an athletic scholarship to attend the University of Florida, where he played for coach Steve Spurrier's Florida Gators football team from 1995 to 1998.  George was an Academic All-SEC and All-American performer, graduating with degrees in therapeutic recreation and leisure service management.

The Gators won Southeastern Conference (SEC) championships in 1995 and 1996, and a Bowl Alliance national championship in 1996.  George returned an interception for an 89-yard touchdown in the Gators' 33–20 victory over the Tennessee Volunteers in 1997, which remains the third longest touchdown return in Gators history.  As a senior in 1998, he was recognized as a coaches' first-team All-SEC selection and an honorable mention All-American by Football News. George was ejected before the Gators' loss in the Florida-Florida State game in 1998, following a multiplayer scuffle.

Professional career 

During his two-season NFL career, he appeared in thirty-one games.  Allocated to the Frankfurt Galaxy of NFL Europe in 2001. George saw time in non regular season games with the Patriots and Panthers in 2001, Titans in 2002 and went to training camp with the Edmonton Eskimos in 2003.

Personal life 

George is a Christian and received his Doctorate in Divinity early 2015. George is the CEO of two companies, on the board of a record label, and is a professional speaker.  He started his own company, H.E.A.T. Pro Fitness.  He is certified as a NESTA master trainer, certified strength and conditioning specialist (CSCS) and AFAA.  George has started his own foundation, Patriotic Mentoring, to assist with mentoring and developing youth and young adults. George lives in Fort Mill, South Carolina. He is married and the father of three, two daughters and one son.

See also 

 Florida Gators football, 1990–99
 List of Florida Gators in the NFL Draft

References

Bibliography 

 Carlson, Norm, University of Florida Football Vault: The History of the Florida Gators, Whitman Publishing, LLC, Atlanta, Georgia (2007).  .
 Golenbock, Peter, Go Gators!  An Oral History of Florida's Pursuit of Gridiron Glory, Legends Publishing, LLC, St. Petersburg, Florida (2002).  .
 Hairston, Jack, Tales from the Gator Swamp: A Collection of the Greatest Gator Stories Ever Told, Sports Publishing, LLC, Champaign, Illinois (2002).  .
 McCarthy, Kevin M.,  Fightin' Gators: A History of University of Florida Football, Arcadia Publishing, Mount Pleasant, South Carolina (2000).  .
 Nash, Noel, ed., The Gainesville Sun Presents The Greatest Moments in Florida Gators Football, Sports Publishing, Inc., Champaign, Illinois (1998).  .

1975 births
Living people
Players of Canadian football from Cincinnati
Players of American football from Cincinnati
American football cornerbacks
American football safeties
Florida Gators football players
New England Patriots players